Merv Haney (born August 13, 1949) is a Canadian former professional ice hockey defenceman.

During the 1972–73 season, Haney played seven games in the World Hockey Association with the Ottawa Nationals.

References

External links

1949 births
Canadian ice hockey defencemen
Ice hockey people from Manitoba
Living people
Mohawk Valley Comets players
Ottawa Nationals players
Roanoke Valley Rebels (EHL) players
Salem Rebels (EHL) players